Neeraj Vora (22 January 1963  14 December 2017) was an Indian film director, writer, actor and composer from Gujarat. He made a mark in Bollywood with his work as a writer for Ram Gopal Verma's film Rangeela (1995). His directorial debut was Akshay Kumar starrer Khiladi 420 in 2000 and also directed Phir Hera Pheri (2006). He has written screenplay and dialogues of some popular Bollywood comedy films including Hera Pheri franchise, Garam Masala (2005), Bhagam Bhag (2006), Golmaal : fun unlimited (2006), Bhool Bhulaiya (2007). As an actor, His notable work includes Mann (1999), Hello Brother (1999), Khatta Meetha (2010), Bol Bachchan (2012).

He suffered a stroke in October 2016, putting him in coma. He was working on Hera Pheri 3 before he went into coma and died on 14 December 2017 at 4 a.m. in Criticare hospital, Mumbai.

Early life and career
Vora was born in Bhuj, Gujarat in a Gujarati family in 1963. But he grew up in Santacruz, a suburb of Mumbai, Maharashtra. His father, Pandit Vinayak Rai Nanalal Vora was a classical musician and a proponent of Tar-Shehnai. His father popularised Tar-Shehnai as the solo instrument for classical music.

As a child, Vora had no access to Bollywood movies. As he hailed from a classical musician's family, listening to film music and watching films was not allowed. His mother Premila Ben had a tremendous fascination for films, and she used to secretly take her son Neeraj to watch movies. Vora went to famous Pupils' Own School in Khar, Mumbai. Many famous celebrities such as Falguni Pathank, Kinjal Bakshi, Tina Munim were his compatriots at this school.

Many students from his school used to attend music coaching classes conducted by his father, who insisted on teaching classical Indian music while Neeraj would sneakily teach them how to play Bollywood songs on harmonium. This made Neeraj very popular at the school.

Luckily, a lot of Gujarati drama stalwarts followed his father's work and knew him personally, following which he got inclined towards Gujarati theatre. His love for theatre began at the age of 6, and when his father discovered this at the age of 13, he supported Vora and asked him to follow his passion.

Acting
During his college days, he started working professionally as an actor and he received intercollegiate awards for drama. In 1984, he worked for the film Holi, by Ketan Mehta and later did a television show Choti Badi Baatien, Circus.

He later worked as an actor in Rangeela too, as the film director wanted to bring down the sets and the actor was absent. Neeraj Vora, who had written the script, played the role to finish shooting. After seeing that scene, Anil Kapoor and Priyadarshan called him for Virasat, followed by Aamir for Mann and several other projects.

Drama
His 1992 Gujarati play Aflatoon, which was a superhit was adapted by Rohit Shetty for Golmaal. The play was written and directed by Neeraj Vora.

Writing
After Circus in 1993, Neeraj Vora, Ashutosh Gowarikar and Deepak Tijori got together and made Pehla Nasha, with Deepak Tijori as lead actor. Neeraj Vora was the writer and his he along with his brother directed music as Neeraj-Uttank. Later his career in writing took off after he wrote for Rangeela and then Akele Hum Akele Tum, Josh, Badshah, Chori Chori Chupke Chupke, Awara Paagal Deewana, Deewane Huye Paagal, Ajnabee, Hera Pheri and Phir Hera Pheri among many others. Vora's work has always been appreciated by the critics. For Phir Hera Pheri, film critic Taran Adarsh said: "Vora's dialogues, as always, are outstanding!"

Film direction
He first directed Khiladi 420, which did not fare well. After that he decided to produce movies and took up Familywala. After writing Awara Paagal Deewana and Deewane Huye Paagal for Firoz Nadiadwala, they collaborated for Phir Hera Pheri, which was to be directed by Satish Kaushik, but following the problems with dates, Neeraj Vora got the chance to direct it.

Vora was slated to direct Hera Pheri 3, but ultimately was replaced by Ahmed Khan following the departure of actors John Abraham, Abhishek Bachchan and Sunil Shetty, due to conflicts with Vora. Vora was retained as the film's executive producer, but following his stroke in October 2016 and his death in December 2017, it was confirmed on May 11, 2018 that Hera Pheri 3 will now be directed by Indra Kumar. But now Indra Kumar has left the film and the original director Priyadarshan has confirmed that he will direct the movie with the three original protagonists Akshay Kumar, Sunil Shetty and Paresh Rawal.

 Death 
Neeraj Vora, who had been suffering from an illness for a long time, died at the age of 54 on 14 December 2017. The actor-director was reportedly in a coma for 13 months after suffering from a massive heart-attack and brain stroke. He reportedly breathed his last at 4 am at Criti Care hospital in Andheri, Mumbai. Vora had been staying at producer Firoz Nadiadwala’s house since October 2016 after slipping into coma due to a heart-attack followed by a brain stroke. Nadiadwala had brought him to his home and converted a room into a make-shift Intensive Care Unit (ICU).

 Filmography 

 Director 

 Run Bhola Run (shelved)
 Shortkut: The Con Is On (2009)
 Familywala (2009)
 Phir Hera Pheri (2006)
 Khiladi 420 (2000)

 Writer 

 Pehla Nasha (1993)
 Baazi (1995)
 Rangeela (1995) (dialogue)
 Baadshah (1999)
 Mela (2000)
 Hera Pheri (2000)
 Josh (2000)
 Khiladi 420 (2000)
 Chori chori chupke chupke (2001) (story)
 Ajnabee (2001)
 Yeh tera ghar Yeh mera ghar (2001)
 Awaara paagal deewana (2002) (dialogue)
 Kehta hai dil baar baar (2002) (dialogue)
 Tujhe meri kasam (2003) (dialogue)
 Hungama (2003) (dialogue)
 Kuch Naa kaho (2003)
 Hulchul (2004)
 Kasak (2005)
 Garam Masala (2005) (dialogue)
 Deewane huye paagal (2005) (dialogue)
 Phir hera pheri (2006)
 Chup chup ke (2006) (dialogue)
 Golmaal : fun unlimited (2006) 
 Bhagam Bhag (2007)
 Fool N Final (2007)
 Bhool bhulaiyaa (2007)
 Shortkut : The con is on (2009)Kamaal Dhamaal Malamaal (2013)Run Bhola Run (2019) (shelved) 
 Zaalim (2025)

 Actor 
 Welcome Back (2015) As Badshah Khan
 Phata Poster Nikhla Hero Bol Bachchan (2012) As Maakhan
 Kamaal Dhamaal Malamaal (2012) 
 Department (2012)
 Tezz (2012)
 Bin Bulaye Baraati(2011) as police commissioner 
 Khatta Meetha (2010)
 Na Ghar Ke Na Ghaat Ke (2010)
 Familywala (2009)
 Khushi (2003) As Shimbhu Moshai Maine Dil Tujhko Diya (2002) As College Principal Tum Se Achcha Kaun Hai (2002)
 Company (2002)
 Yeh Teraa Ghar Yeh Meraa Ghar (2001)
 Dhadkan (2000)
 Har Dil Jo Pyar Karega (2000)
 Jung (2000)
 Pukar (2000)
 Mast (1999)
 Hello Brother (1999) As Sr. Inspector
 Baadshah  (1999)
 Mann (1999)
 Satya (1998)
 Daud: Fun on the Run (1997)
 Virasat (1997)
 Akele Hum Akele Tum (1995)
 Rangeela (1995)
 Raju Ban Gaya Gentleman (1992)
 Salim Langde Pe Mat Ro (1989)
 Holi (1984)

References

External links 

Bollywoodhungama.com

1963 births
2017 deaths
Film directors from Gujarat
Male actors in Hindi cinema
Hindi-language film directors
People from Bhuj
21st-century Indian film directors
Hindi screenwriters
20th-century Indian dramatists and playwrights
20th-century Indian male actors
21st-century Indian male actors
Indian male film actors
Screenwriters from Gujarat